Su Shanshan (born March 23, 1997 in Suizhou, Hubei) is a Chinese singer and actress, and member of Chinese idol group SNH48, as part of Team NII. Previously, she was a member of BEJ48's Team E.

Career
On January 18, 2016, Su became a 6th-generation member of SNH48, and on April 20, she was transferred to BEJ48's Team E. On April 29, she made her first public performance as a member of BEJ48 during Team E's first stage, "Pajama Drive". In May, Japanese media referred to her as a "once in 40,000 years beauty" due to the many selfies she posted on Weibo. On June 20, Su was part of the judging panel for talent-scouting competition I'm a Big Talent Scout. On July 30, during SNH48's third General Election, Su came in seventh within BEJ48, becoming part of BEJ48's Top 7. On September 38, she, along with the rest of BEJ48's Top 7, was involved in a photoshoot for the October issue of the Chinese-language edition of L'Officiel Hommes. On November 27, she became an official spokesperson for the iQIYI TV Fruit.

On January 7, 2017, Su participated in the SNH48 Request Hour Setlist Best 50 (3rd Edition). On May 9, she attended the press conference for the SNK and iDRAGONS Creative Studio-produced The King of Fighters: Destiny. On May 17, she starred in Studio48's web movie, "大唐嘻游记". On July 29, during SNH48's fourth General Election, she came in 21st with 32151 votes, and became part of the Under Girls. Meanwhile, she came in second within BEJ48.

On February 3, 2018, Su participated in SNH48's fourth Request Time, in which the song "Four Seasons", performed with SHY48's Wang Shimeng, BEJ48's Feng Sijia and SNH48's Zhang Dansan, came in first. As she was the center of the song, she was awarded with a solo music video.

On March 12, 2020, Su participated in Youth With You (Idol Producer Season 3) and ranked 40th.

Discography

With BEJ48

EPs

With SNH48

EPs

Original Singles

Units

Stage Units

Concert units

Filmography

Web series

References

External links
 Official Member Profile 
 

1997 births
Living people
People from Suizhou
BEJ48 members
Singers from Hubei
Youth With You contestants